Hassan Fathi (born 2 September 1959) is an Iranian film director and screenwriter. He's one of the most well known and successful Iranian directors. Fathi is best known for his popular historical TV series.

Career 
He holds a bachelor's degree in psychology from the University of Shahid Beheshti and a master's degree in directing from the Islamic Azad University of Tehran.
Fathi is a creative dramatist and psychologist. He started his artistic activities with playing in college theatre. However, he started his professional activities and entered the world of art since 1989 by writing critiques of theater and cinema in journals such as Soroush, Tamashakhaneh, Donyayetassvir, and Namayesh as well as theater writing and directing. In this respect, he can be considered a researcher art and cinema as well. Since 1993, he entered television and started making TV series and in 2004, he joined the directors of Iranian cinema by making the movie "Marriage, Iranian Style". Fathi also teaches as a professor at various universities and is now the educational manager of the Art and Cultural Institute of Karname.
Fathi made two big series in Iran "Zero Degree Turn" and "Shahrzad".
TV series of "Hamsayeha", "Pahlevanan nemimirand", "Farad dir ast", "Shabe dahom", "Mive Mamnooe", "Lighter Than Darkness", "Tears and Smiles", and "Dar masire zayandeh rood" as well as the tele-theaters of "A Murder Mystery", "Mousetrap", and telefilm of "Manuscript" are the results of 18 years of continuous activity of Hassan Fathi in the field of television programs.

Filmography

Film

Web

Television

series
Directing the TV series "Hamsayeha", ("Neighbors"), Channel 2 - 1993
 Writing and directing the TV series "Pahlevanan Nemimirand", ("Heroes never die"), Channel 2 - 1996
 Directing the TV series "Farda dir ast", ("Tomorrow is too late"), Channel 3 - 1997
 Writing and directing the TV series "Roshantar az khamooshi", ("Lighter Than Darkness"), Sima Film - 1999
 Writing and directing the TV series "Tenth Night", ("Tenth Night"), Channel 1 - 2000
 Writing and directing the TV series "Zero Degree Turn", Channel 1 - 2005
 Directing the TV series "The Forbidden Fruit", written by Alireza Naderi and Alireza Kazemipour, Channel 2 - 2007
 Directing the TV series "Tears and Smiles", ("Ashkha va Labkhandha") written by Alireza Naderi and Alireza Kazemipour, Channel 1 - 2008
 Directing the TV series "In the Strand of Zayandeh Rud " written by Alireza Naderi, Channel 1 - 2010
 Directing the TV series "The Times", written by Alireza Kazemipour, Saeed Jalali, and Saeid Tashakori, Channel 3 - 2012

films
 Writing and directing the telefilm "A Typical Day" - 2012
 Writing and directing the telefilm "Manuscript" - 2003
 Rewriting and directing the telefilm "Remember Your Dreams" written by Farhad Towhidi - 2004
 Writing and directing the telefilm "Reverse Gear" - 2009
 Directing the telefilm "Carousels" written by Alireza Masoudi - 2012

Documentaries
 Researching and writing of the 18-part documentary series on "History of the World Theatre"; Channel 2 - 1992
 Researching and writing an 18-part documentary series on "The History and Evolution of Art", Channel 2 - 1992
 Researching and writing a 26-part series on "The History of Iran Traditional Plays", Jame-Jam TV Network - 2007
 Writing and directing the documentary " unfinished trip" on the biography of Nader Ebrahimi - 2012

Theaters 
 Acting in the play "Four Boxes" written by Bahram Beyzai and directed by Ferdous Kavyani; Tehran, Niavaran Cultural Center (1980-2006)
 Writer and director of the play "Hey Hey Matador", City Theater of Tehran, Qashqai Hall, 1989
 Writer and director of "Hero and Fairy Mockery", Tehran, Hall of Art, 1990
 Directing the play "Inidra Judgment" written by Dhan Gopal Mukerji, Tehran, Sanglaj Hall, 1991
 Directing the play "In the Cold Streets of the Night" written by Azam Boroujerdi, Tehran, Azadi Museum, 1993
 Directing the tele-theatre " Queens of France" written by Toronto Wilder, Channel 2, 1994
 Directing and rewriting the tele-theatre "A Murder Mystery" written by Agatha Christie , Channel 2, 1994
 Directing the tele-theatre "Misunderstanding" by Albert Camus, Channel 2, 1995
 Directing and rewriting "The Mousetrap" written by Agatha Christie, Channel 2, 1996
 Directing and rewriting the tele-theatre "John Gabriel Borkman" written by Henrik Ibsen, Channel 2

Awards and nominations 
 Best Director Award for the telefilm "Reverse Gear", The first Jame-Jam TV Festival, January 2012
 Diploma of honor and a statuette for best director of the telefilm "Reverse Gear", The Fajr Film Festival, 2011
 Award for the best TV screenplay for the TV series "Shabe Dahom", Picture World Ceremony, 2002
 Diploma of honor and a golden statuette for the screenplay of "Shabe Dahom", The 4th Festival of Radio and Television, 2003
 Award for the best TV script for the TV series "Roshantar az khamooshi", The Picture World Ceremony, 2004
 Award for the best director of the series "Zero Degree Turn" and "Mive mammnooe", The Bests of Jame-Jam Global Channel Festival, audience voting, 2007
 nominated for the Crystal Simorgh for Best Director at the 27th Fajr International Film Festival for "Postchi se bar dar nemizanad", The Critics of Iran Cinema Ceremony, 2009
 Diploma of honor and a golden statue for artistic directing of the tele-theatre "A Murder Mystery", The IRIB Festival, 1995

Notes

External links

 

Iranian film directors
Living people
1959 births
Iranian screenwriters
People from Tehran
Persian-language film directors